My My My or similar forms may refer to:

 "My My My" (Armand Van Helden song), 2004
 "My, My, My" (Johnny Gill song), 1990
 "My My My!" (Troye Sivan song), 2018

See also
 My (disambiguation)
 My My (disambiguation)
 Me Me Me (disambiguation)
 My Oh My (disambiguation)